The members of the Iraqi Kurdistan Parliament for Third Term were elected on 25 July 2009.

Members of the Iraqi Kurdistan Parliament

Kurdistan List reserved seats

Movement for Change reserved seats.

Reform and Service List reserved seats.

IMK List reserved seats.

Social Justice and Freedom List reserved seats.

TDM List reserved seats.

CSAPC reserved seats.

National Rafidain List reserved seats.

Independent Armenian reserved seats.

The Turkman Reform List reserved seats.

Erbil Turkmans List-Hawler reserved seats.

References

External links
Kurdistan Parliament website

2009 elections in Iraq
2009 in Iraqi Kurdistan
Members of the Kurdistan Region Parliament